Thomas Fairley (12 October 1932 - 16 April 2018) was an English professional footballer who played as a goalkeeper for Sunderland.

References

1932 births
2018 deaths
People from Houghton-le-Spring
Footballers from Tyne and Wear
English footballers
Association football goalkeepers
Sunderland A.F.C. players
Carlisle United F.C. players
Cambridge City F.C. players
English Football League players